Demirözü  (former Hortu) is a village in Gülnar district of Mersin Province, Turkey. The village is situated in Toros Mountains. The population of the village was 326 as of 2012. There are two ponds with reed beds to the northeast of the village.

References

Villages in Gülnar District